Zheng Saisai was the defending champion, and successfully defended her title, defeating Liu Fangzhou in the final, 6–3, 6–1.

Seeds

Draw

Finals

Top half

Bottom half

References
Main Draw

Industrial Bank Cup - Singles
Industrial Bank Cup